Paragnorima is a genus of moths belonging to the subfamily Thyatirinae of the Drepanidae.

Species
 Paragnorima fuscescens (Hampson, 1893)

Former species
 Paragnorima brunnea Leech, 1900
 Paragnorima transitans (Houlbert, 1921)

References

 , 1912, in Seitz, Die Gross-Schmetterlinge der Erde 2: 329
 , 2007, Esperiana Buchreihe zur Entomologie Band 13: 1-683 

Thyatirinae
Drepanidae genera